To Whom It May Concern is the debut studio album by American singer-songwriter Lisa Marie Presley. It was released on April 8, 2003, in the United States and Canada.

Two singles were released from the album: "Lights Out" and "Sinking In". The video for "Lights Out" reached  15 on the CMT Top 20 Countdown.

A song Presley wrote about her ex-husband Michael Jackson, "Disciple", was cut from the album prior to its release.

Critical reception

The album received positive reviews from critics who complimented Presley's vocals and her songwriting.

Los Angeles Times critic Robert Hilburn reviewed Presley's debut album and said, "The music on her new album, has a stark, uncompromising tone", and later said, "Presley's gutsy blues-edged voice has a distinctive flair."

AllMusic critic Stephen Thomas Erlewine said: "This is a sharp, ambitious mainstream pop/rock album performed by a singer with real character – thankfully, one that's surly, not sweet, since there's been too much sweetness from divas in the 2000s", giving the album four out of five stars.

Commercial performance
The album sold 142,000 copies during its first week of release, and debuted at No. 5 on the Billboard 200 album chart. In June 2003, the Recording Industry Association of America certified the album gold.

Track listing

Personnel

Musicians

 Lisa Marie Presley – lead and background vocals
 Eric Rosse – organ, synthesizer, piano, Hammond organ, programming, sound effects, Fender Rhodes, string arrangements
 David Campbell – string arrangements (tracks 3, 5, 6, 7, 11 and 12)
 Rusty Anderson, Doyle Bramhall II, Jon Brion, Steve Caton – guitars
 Paul Bushnell – bass
 Lenny Castro – percussion
 Matt Chamberlain – acoustic and electronic percussion
 Mike Elizondo – bass
 Abe Laboriel Jr. – drums, percussion, guitars
 Wendy Melvoin – guitars
 Zac Rae – Chamberlin
 Patrick Warren – piano
 Bruce Watson – guitars, mandolin
 Lyle Workman – guitars

Production

 Eric Rosse – producer, engineer, editing
 Andrew Slater – producer, executive producer
 Steve Genewick – assistant engineer
 Mike Glines – assistant engineer
 Fernio Hernandez – mix assistant
 Jimmy Hoyson – assistant engineer
 Tom Lord-Alge – mixing
 Charles Paakkari – assistant engineer
 Robert Read – mixing assistant
 Ronnie Rivera – engineer
 Jim Scott – mixing
 Howard Willing – engineer, editing
 Chris Wonzer – assistant engineer

Charts and certifications

Weekly charts

Year-end charts

Certifications

References

Lisa Marie Presley albums
2003 debut albums
Albums arranged by David Campbell (composer)
Albums produced by Eric Rosse
Capitol Records albums